Fox Creek is a south flowing stream in Douglas and Wright counties of the southern Missouri Ozarks. It is a tributary to Bryant Creek. The stream source is about three quarters of a mile east of Missouri Route C just southeast of the town of Norwood in southern Wright County. The stream flows in a meandering southerly direction past Denlow on Missouri Route 76; east of Champion; just west of Gentryville on Missouri Route 14; and Bertha to its confluence with Bryant Creek just south of Bertha.

References

Rivers of Douglas County, Missouri
Rivers of Wright County, Missouri
Rivers of Missouri